Michael Allison (born August 4, 1990) is a Canadian professional basketball player for the Gifu Swoops of the Japanese B.League. He played college basketball at the University of Maine with the Black Bears. Allison also has experience playing with the Durham Wildcats of the British Basketball League.

Early life 
Allison was born on August 4, 1990 Eileen Margrate and Wayne David Allison and grew up in Lynden, Ontario. His father had attended Wooster College and had experience with the Canada men's national basketball team. Mike attended St. Mary's Catholic Secondary School and went on to become school Athlete of the Year and the team's Most Valuable Player. Later, Allison trained at the National Elite Development Academy in Lynden and was eventually selected to play for the Canadian junior national team.

Professional career 
In September 2013, Allison signed a one-year contract with the Durham Wildcats of the British Basketball League after being awarded an athletic scholarship by Durham University to study for a master's degree. He quickly became one of the league's top shot-blockers and rebounders.

For the following season, Allison competed with the Mississauga Power of the National Basketball League of Canada. In the summer of 2015, he played with Blessed Sacrament Nation in the North of the Border Basketball League. Allison returned to the NBL Canada for the next year with the Niagara River Lions.

International career 
In 2009, Allison joined the Canadian junior national team for Mondial Juniors de Basket in France, which was regarded as one of the top basketball competitions in Europe at that level. In the tournament, Allison averaged 6.2 points and 3.2 rebounds per game as his team took the gold medal. He most notably recorded 11 points and six rebounds in the championship game victory over Lithuania. Highlighting Lithuania's squad was Donatas Motiejūnas, while Canada was led by Kelly Olynyk. Allison also competed with the national team at the Under-18 World Qualifier, where Canada finished third.

References

External links 
Mike Allison at RealGM
Mike Allison at Eurobasket.com 

1990 births
Living people
Alumni of Durham University
Basketball people from Ontario
Canadian expatriate basketball people in the United States
Canadian men's basketball players
Centers (basketball)
Gifu Swoops players
Maine Black Bears men's basketball players
Mississauga Power players
Niagara River Lions players
Power forwards (basketball)
Sportspeople from Hamilton, Ontario